Narendra Man Singh (1958-?-27 November 2009) was a Nepalese footballer. He was the first Nepali player to play professional football in India, and played for the Nepal national team in the 1982 Asian Games. He played nearly eight years for the two Indian sides Mafatlal Group SC and Mahindra United.

Biography

Early life and education 
Narendra Man Singh was born in Kathmandu, Nepal. A gifted man with a passion for football, he was a kind hearted person. He was the son of Dwarika Man Singh. He had 6 siblings. The eldest of the siblings Surrendra Man Singh died at an early age and the youngest male sibling Yogendra Man Singh died as an infant. With his passion for football him and his younger sibling Birendra Man Singh became the Nations pride as they got the opportunity to represent our Nation in the field of International football.

Career

Marriage and children 
Singh was married and had a son.

Death and afterward 
He died of jaundice on 27 November 2009.

References 

1958 births
2009 deaths
Sportspeople from Kathmandu
Nepalese footballers
Nepalese expatriate footballers
Nepalese expatriate sportspeople in India
Association footballers not categorized by position